Digitivalva nephelota is a moth of the family Acrolepiidae. It is found in Uganda.

References

Acrolepiidae
Moths described in 1965